Cheilosia chrysocoma  is a European species of hoverfly.

Description
External images
For terms see Morphology of Diptera
The wing length is 8-10·25 mm. Wing cross veins darkened. Antennae with third segment brownish-red to yellowish-red and squarish above at the tip and the arista almost bare. Face with a small and rounded central knob situated lower than is usual in Cheilosia. Abdomen with conspicuously bright foxy-tawny pubescence. Mimics Osmia (Apidae).

Distribution
Cheilosia chrysocoma is a Palearctic species. North Europe and Central Europe East to Russian Far East and
Siberia.

Biology
The habitat is wetland and Alnus and Salix woodland. Fen carr and alluvial softwood forest. Along tracks and in glades, on low-growing vegetation in the sun. Flowers visited include Caltha, Crataegus, Narcissus, Prunus, Ranunculus and Salix.

Females have been seen egg-laying on Angelica sylvestris which may be the larval host plant. Flight period is April to June.

References

External links
Biolib

Diptera of Europe
Taxa named by Johann Wilhelm Meigen
Eristalinae
Insects described in 1822